Moberly is an unincorporated community in Spencer Township, Harrison County, Indiana, in the United States.

History
Moberly was first settled in about 1850.

References

Unincorporated communities in Harrison County, Indiana
1850 establishments in Indiana
Unincorporated communities in Indiana
Populated places established in 1850